Jovan Samuilović Horvat de Kurtič, also referred to as Ivan Horvat (also referred to as ; also known as Jovan Horvat, Ivan Khorvat, Ivan Samoylovich Khorvat, and Ivan Samuilovich Khorvat;Petrovaradin, Habsburg monarchy, 1722 — Stary Saltiv, near Kharkiv, Imperial Russia, 18 November 1786), was a Russian general of Serbian origin who founded New Serbia in the modern Kirovohrad Oblast.

Biography
Jovan Horvat's ancestors were originally from Slavonia. In the 1670s, his grandfather Marko Kurtić settled in the Habsburg Military Frontier. Marko distinguished himself in the Austrian military fighting ancestral enemies and earned a patent of nobility and a coat of arms from Emperor Leopold I. His son Samuil became a landowner in a village named after the family, Curtici, near Arad.

In 1726 Samuil received a Nobiliary particle de Kurtič from Charles VI after serving as governor of Waradin (now Oradea, Romania). Later, Samuil's son Jovan, born in Petrovaradin in 1722, would carry the nobiliary particle proudly as he advanced through military ranks in an Austrian infantry regiment and later in Russia where his title was also recognized.

In 1751 Jovan Samuilović Horvat de Kurtič, his brother Dimitrije, and Nikola and Teodor Chorba contacted Mikhail Petrovich Bestuzhev-Ryumin, the Russian Ambassador to Austria, and requested his permission to migrate to Russia. Bestuzhev-Ryumin accepted their request on the condition that it be approved by the Russian Government. The Government not only approved their immigration but offered them and their families citizenship and employment in the Russian military.
In fact, all the families of the officers who served in the Austrian military were granted citizenship and all officers were given jobs in the Russian army.
While waiting for a response from St. Petersburg, Jovan Horvat, along with 281 other military officers and subalterns submitted their resignation request to the Hofkriegsrat,  the Aulic War Council of Austria, so that they could be released from the Austrian military and transfer into Russian service. Their resignations were immediately forwarded to Maria Theresa, the Austrian Empress who at the time was on friendly terms with the Russian Empress, had no problem discharging and freeing them from their obligations.

On the 13th of July 1751, Ambassador Bestuzhev-Ryumin received confirmation from Empress Elizabeth of Russia that Horvat and the other officers were given permission to leave for Russia and that jobs would be made available for them in the Russian military. Horvat eventually would be promoted to General and the other officers who showed equal élan achieved high ranks in the Russian military as well. Bestuzhev-Ryumin, his secretary Chemyev, Horvat and brothers Nikola, Todor and Jovan Chorba, Jovan Šević, and Rajko Depreradović set out to organize the migration in three  groups.

Led by Jovan Horvat, a convoy of officers and their families and others left Austria and arrived in Imperial Russia at the end of September 1751.

Most of the settlements were named after the ones in their homeland. With the Empress's consent, Jovan  Horvat built the foundation of the Fort of St. Elizabeth (named in honor of her Saint patroness, now located in today's Kropyvnytskyi, an administrative center of the Kirovohrad Oblast). The fort would play an important role in Russia's victory over Turkey. After the Russo-Turkish War, Lieutenant General Peter Tekeli who was the commander of all armed forces stationed in Novorossiya (formerly New Serbia and Slavo-Serbia), used the Fort of St. Elizabeth to disband the Zaporozhian Cossacks and destroy their base, the Zaporozhian Sich in 1775.

In the New Serbian corpus founded in 1759 that united the regiments under his command, Horvat saw the possibility for the formation of the Serbian national core on the territory of the Russian Empire. He formed and was the head of the executive power with departments for military affairs, foreign affairs, economy, and finances, though he made many enemies along the way, namely Simeon Piščević as attested by his memoir.

The Supreme Court, which he initiated and founded, was the same court that sentenced him in exile for alleged abuse of power and corruption. Thus by decree of Catherine the Great, he was dismissed in 1762 and expelled to Vologda, at the time an insignificant town of Archangelgorod Governorate. He was eventually pardoned by Empress Catherine and allowed to return only after Peter Tekeli's intervention in 1775. Jovan Horvat died in 1786 on his estate at the age of 64.

See also
 Dmitry Horvat
 Rajko Depreradović
 Jovan Šević
 Jovan Albanez
 Ivan Adamovich
 Ilya Duka
 Nikolay Depreradovich
 Simeon Končarević
 Pavle Julinac
 Simeon Piščević
 Mikhail Miloradovich
 Semyon Zorich
 Peter Tekeli
 Georgi Emmanuel
 Marko Ivelich
 Peter Ivanovich Ivelich
 Andrei Miloradovich

References 

1723 births
1786 deaths
Russian people of Serbian descent
Russia
Immigration to Russia
Serb diaspora
18th-century Serbian people
18th-century people from the Russian Empire
Imperial Russian Army generals
People from the Russian Empire of Serbian descent